Panaeolus is a genus of small, black-spored, saprotrophic agarics. The word Panaeolus is Greek for "all variegated", alluding to the spotted gills of the mushrooms produced.

Characteristics 
These fungi are mostly dung and grassland species, some of which are quite common in Europe and North America. The gills of Panaeolus do not deliquesce as do the members of the related genera Coprinellus and Coprinopsis. Members of Panaeolus can also be mistaken for Psathyrella, however the latter genus is usually found growing on wood or lignin-enriched soils and has brittle stipes.

The gills of these mushrooms are black or grey and have a spotty, speckled or cloudy appearance, caused by the way that the dark spores ripen together in tiny patches on the gill surface; different patches darken at different times. The spores are smooth.

The closely related genus Panaeolina shares the spotted gills but they are dark brown (not black) and the spores are ornamented.  This genus is sometimes treated as part of  Panaeolus.

The spores are smooth or roughened, with a germ pore, and all species except for Panaeolus foenisecii have a jet black spore print.

Edibility 

No members of Panaeolus are used for food, though some are used as a psychedelic drug. Thirteen species of Panaeolus contain the hallucinogen psilocybin including Panaeolus cyanescens and Panaeolus cinctulus. The bluing hallucinogenic members of this genus were sometimes previously segregated into a separate (but now deprecated) genus, Copelandia, but are now universally classified in Panaeolus.

Several members of this genus are known to contain psilocin and psilocybin and it is suspected that a number of other members of this genus contain unidentified psychoactive compounds.  All members of this genus contain serotonin derivatives.

Notable species

References

External links 
 Key to Panaeolus in the Pacific Northwest
 Panaeolus key by Ola'h that emphasizes microscopic features
 Panaeolus - A Genus of Toadstools
 A Worldwide Geographical Distribution of the Neurotropic Fungi
 Wikispecies - Panaeolus

 
Agaricales genera
Taxa named by Elias Magnus Fries